Stolen Time is a 1955 British crime drama film directed by Charles Deane and starring Richard Arlen, Susan Shaw and Vincent Ball. It was released in the United States in 1958 under the alternative title of Blonde Blackmailer.

Synopsis
After serving seven years in jail for a murder he didn't commit, a man seeks to find out who was really responsible.

Cast
 Richard Arlen as Tony Pelassier 
 Susan Shaw as Carole Carlton 
 Constance Leigh as Marie 
 Vincent Ball as Johnson 
 Andreas Malandrinos as Papa Pelassier 
 Alathea Siddons as Mama Pelassier 
 Arnold Adrian
 Sydney Bromley
 Claudia Carr
 John Dunbar
 Reginald Hearne as Inspector Martin 
 Howard Lang as Scotland Yard detective 
 Patricia Salonika
 Clive St. George

References

Bibliography
 Chibnall, Steve & McFarlane, Brian. The British 'B' Film. Palgrave MacMillan, 2009.

External links

1955 films
British crime drama films
1955 crime drama films
1950s English-language films
British Lion Films films
Films set in London
1950s British films
British black-and-white films